Henry I may refer to:

876–1366
 Henry I the Fowler, King of Germany (876–936)
 Henry I, Duke of Bavaria (died 955)
 Henry I of Austria, Margrave of Austria (died 1018)
 Henry I of France (1008–1060)
 Henry I the Long, Margrave of the Nordmark (c. 1065–1087)
 Henry I of England (1068–1135)
 Henry I, Margrave of the Saxon Ostmark (1070–1103)
 Henry I of Champagne, Count of Champagne (1127–1181)
 Henry I the Bearded, Duke of Poland (1163–1238)
 Henry I, Duke of Brabant (1165–1235)
 Henry I of Jerusalem or Henry II of Champagne (1166–1197)
 Henry I of Constantinople or Henry of Flanders (1174–1216)
 Henry I of Kuenring (1185-1233)
 Henry I of Castile (1204–1217)
 Henry I of Cyprus (1217–1253)
 Henry I of Hesse, Landgrave of Hesse (1244–1308)
 Henry I of Navarre (1244–1274)
 Henry I, Prince of Mecklenburg-Güstrow (c. 1245–1291)
 Henry I of Jawor (1292/96 – by 1346)
 Henry I of Ziębice (c. 1350 – aft. 8 August 1366)

1512-1820
 Henry I of Portugal or the Cardinal-King (1512–1580)
 Henri I de Montmorency (1534–1614)
 Henri I de Savoie, Duc de Nemours (1572–1632)
 Henrique I of Kongo (died 1568)
 Henry I, Duke of Guise (1550–1588)
 Henry I, Duke of Münsterberg-Oels (1448–1498)
 Henry I, Prince of Condé (1552–1588)
 Henry I of Haiti or Henri Christophe (1767–1820)

See also